The 1893 Colorado Silver and Gold football team was an American football team that represented the University of Colorado as a member of the Colorado Football Association (CFA) during the 1893 college football season. The season marked the program's first conference affiliation and was the last season without a head coach. Colorado compiled an overall record of 2–3 with a mark of 1–1 in conference play, placing second in the CFA.

Schedule

References

Colorado
Colorado Buffaloes football seasons
Colorado Silver and Gold football